The Ukrainian Republican Party (Ukrajinska Respublikanska Partija) is a political party in Ukraine registered in December 2006 as Ukrainian Republican Party Lukyanenko. The party was led by political veteran Levko Lukyanenko(1928-2018). The party did not participate in the 2007 parliamentary election as well as the 2012 Ukrainian parliamentary election nationwide proportional party-list system; instead three members of the party tried to win a seat in three of the 225 local single-member districts. None of the parties candidates did win.

The party did participate in the 2014 Ukrainian parliamentary election in 5 single-member districts; but again did not win seats. The party has not taken part in national elections since 2012.

The party occupies a few seats in local and provincial councils. In the 2020 Ukrainian local elections the party gained 4 deputies (0.01% of all available mandates).

References

External links
  

Conservative parties in Ukraine
Political parties established in 2006
Nationalist parties in Ukraine